The following were the events of gymnastics for the year 2019 throughout the world.

Acrobatic gymnastics
 March 8 – 10: FIG World Cup 2019 (AcG #1) in  Maia
 Pair winners:  (Timofei Ivanov & Maksim Karavaev) (m) /  (Rita Ferreira & Ana Teixeira) (f)
 Mixed Pair winners:  (Victoria Aksenova & Kirill Startsev)
 Men's Group winners:  (Henrique Piqueiro, Frederico Silva, Henrique Silva, & Miguel Silva)
 Women's Group winners:  (Daria Chebulanka, Anastasiia Parshina, & Kseniia Zagoskina)
 March 22 – 24: FIG World Cup 2019 (AcG #2) in  Las Vegas
 Pair winners:  (Daniyel Dil & Vadim Shulyar) (m) /  (Rita Ferreira & Ana Teixeira) (f)
 Mixed Pair winners:  (Victoria Aksenova & Kirill Startsev)
 Men's Group winners:  (FU Zhi, GUO Pei, JIANG Heng, & ZHANG Junshuo)
 Women's Group winners:  (Julia Ivonchyk, Veranika Nabokina, & Karina Sandovich)
 April 12 – 14: FIG World Cup 2019 (AcG #3) in  Puurs
 Pair winners:  (Timofei Ivanov & Maksim Karavaev) (m) /  (Rita Ferreira & Ana Teixeira) (f)
 Mixed Pair winners:  (Victoria Aksenova & Kirill Startsev)
 Men's Group winners:  (FU Zhi, GUO Pei, JIANG Heng, & ZHANG Junshuo)
 Women's Group winners:  (Daria Chebulanka, Anastasiia Parshina, & Kseniia Zagoskina)
 September 13 – 15: FIG World Cup 2019 (AcG #4) in  Lisbon
 Pairs winners:  (Timofei Ivanov & Maksim Karavaev) (m) /  (Aliia Salakhova & Diana Tukhvatullina) (f)
 Mixed Pair winners:  (Victoria Aksenova & Kirill Startsev)
 Men's Group winners:  (Henrique Piqueiro, Frederico Silva, Henrique Silva, & Miguel Silva)
 Women's Group winners:  (Or Armony, Tzlil Hurvitz, & Yarin Ovadia)
 October 10 – 12: 2019 Asian Acrobatic Gymnastics Championships in  Tashkent

Aerobic gymnastics
 March 29 – 31: FIG World Cup 2019 (AeG #1) in  Cantanhede
 Individual winners:  Daniel Bali (m) /  Ayse Onbasi (f)
 Mixed Pair winners:  (Daniel Bali & Fanni Mazacs)
 Trio winners:  (Daniel Bali, Balázs Farkas, & Fanni Mazacs)
 Group winners: 
 April 13 & 14: FIG World Cup 2019 (AeG #2) in  Tokyo
 Individual winners:  Ivan Veloz (m) /  Riri Kitazume (f)
 Mixed Pair winners:  (Daniel Bali & Fanni Mazacs)
 Trio winners:  (Daniel Bali, Balázs Farkas, & Fanni Mazacs)
 Group winners: 
 May 24 – 26: 2019 Aerobic Gymnastics European Championships in  Baku
 Individual winners:  Roman Semenov (m) /  Ekaterina Pykhtova (f)
 Mixed Pair winners:  (Daniel Bali & Fanni Mazacs)
 Trio winners:  (Daniel Bali, Balázs Farkas, & Fanni Mazacs)
 Group winners:

Artistic gymnastics

 February 21 – 24: FIG World Cup 2019 (AG #1) in  Melbourne
 Floor winners:  Carlos Yulo (m) /  Vanessa Ferrari (f)
 Vault winners:  Ihor Radivilov (m) /  YEO Seo-jeong (f)
 Men's Horizontal Bar winner:  Hidetaka Miyachi
 Men's Parallel Bars winner:  You Hao
 Men's Pommel Horse winner:  Lee Chih-kai
 Men's Still Rings winner:  Liu Yang
 Women's Balance Beam winner:  ZHAO Shiting
 Women's Uneven Bars winner:  Fan Yilin
 March 2: AT&T American Cup Individual All-Around (FIG World Cup 2019 (IAA #1)) in  Greensboro
 All-Around winners:  Yul Moldauer (m) /  Leanne Wong (f)
 March 14 – 17: FIG World Cup 2019 (AG #2) in  Baku
 Floor winners:  Artem Dolgopyat (m) /  Jade Carey (f)
 Vault winners:  Yang Hak-seon (m) /  Jade Carey (f)
 Men's Horizontal Bar winner:  Epke Zonderland
 Men's Parallel Bars winner:  Vladislav Polyashov
 Men's Pommel Horse winner:  Kohei Kameyama
 Men's Still Rings winner:  Courtney Tulloch
 Women's Balance Beam winner:  Emma Nedov
 Women's Uneven Bars winner:  LYU Jiaqi
 March 16 & 17: EnBW DTB-Pokal Individual All-Around (FIG World Cup 2019 (IAA #2)) in  Stuttgart
 All-Around winners:  Artur Dalaloyan (m) /  Simone Biles (f)
 March 20 – 23: FIG World Cup 2019 (AG #3) in  Doha
 Floor winners:  Alexander Shatilov (m) /  Jade Carey (f)
 Vault winners:  Yang Hak-seon (m) /  Jade Carey (f)
 Men's Horizontal Bar winner:  Tin Srbić
 Men's Parallel Bars winner:  Zou Jingyuan
 Men's Pommel Horse winner:  Lee Chih-kai
 Men's Still Rings winner:  LAN Xingyu
 Women's Balance Beam winner:  LI Qi
 Women's Uneven Bars winner:  Nina Derwael
 March 23: FIG World Cup 2019 (IAA #3) in  Birmingham
 All-Around winners:  Nikita Nagornyy (m) /  Aliya Mustafina (f)
 April 7: FIG World Cup 2019 (IAA #4) in  Tokyo
 All-Around winners:  Sam Mikulak (m) /  Morgan Hurd (f)
 April 10 – 14: 2019 European Artistic Gymnastics Championships (Individual) for Men and Women in  Szczecin
 All-Around winners:  Nikita Nagornyy (m) /  Mélanie de Jesus dos Santos (f)
 Floor winners:  Artur Dalaloyan (m) /  Mélanie de Jesus dos Santos (f)
 Vault winners:  Denis Ablyazin (m) /  Maria Paseka (f)
 Men's Horizontal Bar winner:  Epke Zonderland
 Men's Parallel Bars winner:  Nikita Nagornyy
 Men's Pommel Horse winner:  Max Whitlock
 Men's Still Rings winner:  Denis Ablyazin
 Women's Balance Beam winner:  Alice Kinsella
 Women's Uneven Bars winner:  Anastasia Ilyankova
 May 19 – 21: FIG World Challenge Cup 2019 (AG #1) in  Zhaoqing 
 Floor winners:  Deng Shudi (m) /  LIU Jingxing (f)
 Vault winners:  KIM Hyok (m) /  YU Linmin (f)
 Men's Horizontal Bar winner:  Takuya Sakakibara
 Men's Parallel Bars winner:  Zou Jingyuan
 Men's Pommel Horse winner:  Zou Jingyuan
 Men's Still Rings winner:  Liu Yang
 Women's Balance Beam winner:  LI Shijia
 Women's Uneven Bars winner:  LI Shijia
 May 23 – 26: FIG World Challenge Cup 2019 (AG #2) in  Osijek 
 Floor winners:  Artem Dolgopyat (m) /  Ana Đerek (f)
 Vault winners:  Shek Wai Hung (m) /  Teja Belak (f)
 Men's Horizontal Bar winner:  Alexey Rostov
 Men's Parallel Bars winner:  Robert Tvorogal
 Men's Pommel Horse winner:  Robert Seligman
 Men's Still Rings winner:  Nikita Simonov 
 Women's Balance Beam winner:  Angelina Kysla
 Women's Uneven Bars winner:  Anastasiia Agafonova
 May 30 – June 2: FIG World Challenge Cup 2019 (AG #3) in  Koper 
 Floor winners:  Tomás González (m) /  Ilaria Käslin (f)
 Vault winners:  Shek Wai Hung (m) /  Marina Nekrasova (f)
 Men's Horizontal Bar winner:  Umit Samiloglu
 Men's Parallel Bars winner:  Frank Baines
 Men's Pommel Horse winner:  Rhys McClenaghan
 Men's Still Rings winner:  Nikita Simonov 
 Women's Balance Beam winner:  Zsófia Kovács
 Women's Uneven Bars winner:  Zsófia Kovács
 June 27 – 30: 2019 Junior World Artistic Gymnastics Championships in  Győr (debut event)
 Junior All-Around winners:  Shinnosuke Oka (m) /  Viktoriia Listunova (f)
 Junior Floor winners:  RYU Sung-hyun (m) /  Viktoriia Listunova (f)
 Junior Vault winners:  Gabriel Burtanete (m) /  Kayla di Cello (f)
 Junior Team winners:  (m) /  (f)
 Junior Men's Horizontal Bar winner:  Nazar Chepurnyi
 Junior Men's Parallel Bars winner:  Takeru Kitazono
 Junior Men's Pommel Horse winner:  Takeru Kitazono
 Junior Men's Still Rings winner:  Félix Dolci
 Junior Women's Balance Beam winner:  Elena Gerasimova
 Junior Women's Uneven Bars winner:  Vladislava Urazova
 August 30 – September 1: FIG World Challenge Cup 2019 (AG #4) in  Mersin
 Floor winners:  Aurel Benovic (m) /  Göksu Üçtaş (f)
 Vault winners:  Murad Agharzayev (m) /  Teja Belak (f)
 Men's Horizontal Bar winner:  Umit Samiloglu
 Men's Parallel Bars winner:  Ferhat Arıcan
 Men's Pommel Horse winner:  Sašo Bertoncelj
 Men's Still Rings winner:  İbrahim Çolak
 Women's Balance Beam winner:  Audrey Rousseau
 Women's Uneven Bars winner:  Nazli Savranbasi
 September 6 – 8: FIG World Challenge Cup 2019 (AG #5) in  Szombathely
 Floor winners:  Artem Dolgopyat (m) /  Marina Gonzalez (f)
 Vault winners:  Hidenobu Yonekura (m) /  Marina Nekrasova (f)
 Men's Horizontal Bar winner:  David Vecsernyes
 Men's Parallel Bars winner:  Oleg Vernyayev
 Men's Pommel Horse winner:  Joshua Nathan
 Men's Still Rings winner:  Ihor Radivilov
 Women's Balance Beam winner:  Noémi Makra
 Women's Uneven Bars winner:  Caitlin Rooskrantz
 September 14 & 15: FIG World Challenge Cup 2019 (AG #6) in  Paris 
 Floor winners:  Kazuki Minami (m) /  Diana Varinska (f)
 Vault winners:  Loris Frasca (m) /  Oksana Chusovitina (f)
 Men's Horizontal Bar winner:  Tin Srbić
 Men's Parallel Bars winner:  Kaito Sugimoto
 Men's Pommel Horse winner:  Joshua Nathan
 Men's Still Rings winner:  Samir Aït Saïd
 Women's Balance Beam winner:  Anastasiia Agafonova
 Women's Uneven Bars winner:  Mélanie de Jesus dos Santos
 September 19 – 22: FIG World Challenge Cup 2019 (AG #7) in  Guimarães
 Floor winners:  Takaaki Sugino (m) /  Ana Lago (f)
 Vault winners:  Sebastian Gawronski (m) /  Paula Mejías (f)
 Men's Horizontal Bar winner:  Hirohito Kohama
 Men's Parallel Bars winner:  Takuya Nagano
 Men's Pommel Horse winner:  Takaaki Sugino
 Men's Still Rings winner:  Takuya Nagano
 Women's Balance Beam winner:  Ana Filipa Martins
 Women's Uneven Bars winner:  Frida Esparza
 October 4 – 13: 2019 World Artistic Gymnastics Championships in  Stuttgart
 Individual All-Around winners:  Nikita Nagornyy (m) /  Simone Biles (f)
 Floor winners:  Carlos Yulo (m) /  Simone Biles (f)
 Vault winners:  Nikita Nagornyy (m) /  Simone Biles (f)
 Men's Horizontal Bar winner:  Arthur Mariano
 Men's Parallel Bars winner:  Joe Fraser
 Men's Pommel Horse winner:  Max Whitlock
 Men's Still Rings winner:  İbrahim Çolak
 Women's Balance Beam winner:  Simone Biles
 Women's Uneven Bars winner:  Nina Derwael
 Team winners:  (m) /  (f)
 November 21 – 24: 2019 Turnier der Meister FIG Individual Apparatus World Cup in  Cottbus

Rhythmic gymnastics

 April 5 – 7: FIG World Cup 2019 (RG #1) in  Pesaro
 All-Around winner:  Dina Averina
 Ball winner:  Arina Averina
 Clubs winner:  Dina Averina
 Hoop winner:  Arina Averina
 Ribbon winner:  Dina Averina
 Group All-Around winners: 
 Group Five Balls winners: 
 Group Three Balls & Two Hoops winners: 
 April 12 – 14: FIG World Cup 2019 (RG #2) in  Sofia
 All-Around winner:  Aleksandra Soldatova
 Ball winner:  Ekaterina Selezneva
 Clubs winner:  Linoy Ashram
 Hoop winner:  Linoy Ashram
 Ribbon winner:  Aleksandra Soldatova
 Group All-Around winners: 
 Group Five Balls winners: 
 Group Three Balls & Two Hoops winners: 
 April 19 – 21: FIG World Cup 2019 (RG #3) in  Tashkent
 All-Around winner:  Aleksandra Soldatova
 Ball winner:  Aleksandra Soldatova
 Clubs winner:  Aleksandra Soldatova
 Hoop winner:  Aleksandra Soldatova
 Ribbon winner:  Anastasia Guzenkova
 Group All-Around winners: 
 Group Five Balls winners: 
 Group Three Balls & Two Hoops winners: 
 April 26 – 28: FIG World Cup 2019 (RG #4) in  Baku
 All-Around winner:  Dina Averina
 Ball winner:  Linoy Ashram
 Clubs winner:  Dina Averina
 Hoop winner:  Dina Averina
 Ribbon winner:  Anastasiia Salos
 Group All-Around winners: 
 Group Five Balls winners: 
 Group Three Hoops & Two Clubs winners: 
 May 3 – 5: FIG World Challenge Cup 2019 (RG #1) in  Guadalajara
 All-Around winner:  Aleksandra Soldatova
 Ball winner:  Aleksandra Soldatova
 Clubs winner:  Aleksandra Soldatova
 Hoop winner:  Aleksandra Soldatova
 Ribbon winner:  Aleksandra Soldatova
 Group All-Around winners: 
 Group Five Balls winners: 
 Group Three Hoops & Four Clubs winners: 
 May 16 – 19: 2019 Rhythmic Gymnastics European Championships in  Baku
 Ball winner:  Arina Averina
 Clubs winner:  Arina Averina
 Hoop winner:  Dina Averina
 Ribbon winner:  Dina Averina
 July 19 – 21: 2019 FIG Rhythmic Gymnastics Junior World Championships in  Moscow (debut event)
 Junior All-Around winner: 
 Junior Ball winner:  Lala Kramarenko
 Junior Clubs winner:  Lala Kramarenko
 Junior Ribbon winner:  Dariia Sergaeva
 Junior Rope winner:  Anastasia Simakova
 Junior Group All-Around winners: 
 Junior Group 5-Hoops winners: 
 Junior Group 5-Ribbon winners: 
 Junior All-Around Team Apparatus winners: 
 August 16 – 18: FIG BSB Bank World Challenge Cup 2019 (RG #2) in  Minsk
 All-Around winner:  Dina Averina
 Ball winner:  Dina Averina
 Clubs winner:  Dina Averina
 Hoop winner:  Linoy Ashram
 Ribbon winner:  Dina Averina
 Group All-Around winners: 
 Group Five Balls winners: 
 Group Three Hoops & Two Clubs winners: 
 August 23 – 25: FIG World Challenge Cup 2019 (RG #3) in  Cluj-Napoca
 All-Around winner:  Linoy Ashram
 Ball winner:  Ekaterina Selezneva
 Clubs winner:  Vlada Nikolchenko
 Hoop winner:  Linoy Ashram
 Ribbon winner:  Linoy Ashram
 Group All-Around winners: 
 Group Five Balls winners: 
 Group Three Hoops & Two Clubs winners: 
 August 30 – September 1: FIG World Challenge Cup 2019 (RG #4) in  Kazan 
 All-Around winner:  Dina Averina
 Ball winner:  Dina Averina
 Clubs winner:  Dina Averina
 Hoop winner:  Arina Averina
 Ribbon winner:  Dina Averina
 Group All-Around winners: 
 Group Five Balls winners: 
 Group Three Hoops & Two Clubs winners: 
 September 6 – 8: FIG World Challenge Cup 2019 (RG #5) in  Portimão 
 All-Around winner:  Aleksandra Soldatova
 Ball winner:  Milena Baldassarri
 Clubs winner:  Alexandra Agiurgiuculese
 Hoop winner:  Alexandra Agiurgiuculese
 Ribbon winner:  Milena Baldassarri
 Group All-Around winners: 
 Group Five Balls winners: 
 Group Three Hoops & Two Clubs winners: 
 September 16 – 22: 2019 World Rhythmic Gymnastics Championships in  Baku
 All-Around winner:  Dina Averina
 Ball winner:  Dina Averina
 Clubs winner:  Dina Averina
 Hoop winner:  Ekaterina Selezneva
 Ribbon winner:  Dina Averina
 Group All-Around winners: 
 Group Five Balls winners: 
 Group Three Hoops & Two Clubs winners: 
 Team winners:  (Arina Averina, Dina Averina, & Ekaterina Selezneva)

Trampolining & Tumbling
 February 16 & 17: FIG TRA World Cup 2019 #1 in  Baku
 Trampoline Individual winners:  Uladzislau Hancharou (m) /  LIU Lingling (f)
 Trampoline Synchronized winners:  (Daiki Kishi & Ryosuke Sakai) (m) /  (Valiantsina Bahamolava & Anhelina Khatsian) (f)
 Tumbling Individual winners:  Vadim Afanasev (m) /  Daryna Koziarska (f)
 April 20 & 21: FIG TRA World Cup 2019 #2 in  Minsk
 Trampoline Individual winners:  Mikhail Melnik (m) /  ZHU Xueying (f)
 Trampoline Synchronized winners:  (Uladzislau Hancharou & Aleh Rabtsau) (m) /  (Maryia Makharynskaya & Hanna Hancharova) (f)
 September 21 & 22: FIG TRA World Cup 2019 #3 in  Khabarovsk
 Trampoline Individual winners:  Gao Lei (m) /  Yana Pavlova (f)
 Trampoline Synchronized winners:  (Jeffrey Gluckstein & Aliaksei Shostak) (m) /  (Ayano Kishi & Yumi Takagi) (f)
 Tumbling Individual winners:  Mikhail Malkin (m) /  JIA Fangfang (f)
 Double Mini winners:  Mikhail Zalomin (m) /  Lina Sjoeberg (f)
 October 5 & 6: FIG TRA World Cup 2019 #4 in  Valladolid
 Trampoline Individual winners:  Uladzislau Hancharou (m) /  LIU Lingling (f)
 Trampoline Synchronized winners:  (Daiki Kishi & Ryosuke Sakai) (m) /  (Maryna Kyiko & Svitlana Malkova) (f)
 Tumbling winners:  Vadim Afanasev (m) /  Tachina Peeters (f)
 Double Mini winners:  Mikhail Zalomin (m) /  Aleksandra Bonartseva (f)
 November 28 – December 1: 2019 Trampoline World Championships in  Tokyo

References

External links
 FIG - Fédération Internationale de Gymnastique (International Federation of Gymnastics)

 
Gymnastics by year
2019 sport-related lists